Judaeo-Georgian (also known as Kivruli and Gruzinic) is the traditional Georgian dialect spoken by the Georgian Jews, the ancient Jewish community of the South Caucasus nation of Georgia.

Relationship to other languages
Judaeo-Georgian is the only Kartvelian Jewish dialect. Its status as a distinct language from the Georgian language is the subject of some debate.

With the exception of a significant number of Hebrew loanwords, the language is reportedly largely mutually intelligible with Georgian.

Distribution
Judaeo-Georgian has approximately 85,000 speakers. These include 20,000 speakers in Georgia (1995 est.), and about 59,800 speakers in Israel (2000 est.). The language has approximately 4,000 speakers in New York and undetermined numbers in other communities in the United States, Russia, Belgium, and Canada.

Status
Judaeo-Georgian is, like many Jewish languages spoken there, on the decline in Israel. Its status in Georgia itself is unchanged, except by the rapid decline in the size of the language community, due to emigration beginning in the 1970s, which has seen the departure of some 80% of the community. Authoritative studies of its continued use by other expatriate communities of Georgian Jews have not been conducted.

References

External links
LanguageServer's Judaeo-Georgian page

Jewish languages
Jews and Judaism in Georgia (country)
Georgian-Jewish culture in the United States
Kartvelian languages
Languages of Georgia (country)
Languages of Russia
Georgian language
Georgian-Zan languages